Shek Chau is a small island in the Port Shelter, Hong Kong. It is under the administration of Sai Kung District.

The island has an area of 0.003 km2. It is located off the northwestern coast of the island Yim Tin Tsai.

References

Uninhabited islands of Hong Kong
Sai Kung District
Islands of Hong Kong